Regina Benavente (born January 21, 1932) is an Argentine composer.

Born in Buenos Aires, Benavente was the daughter of Manuel José Benavente, with whom she had her first music lessons. She then entered the Conservatorio Nacional Superior de Música, where she studied harmony, counterpoint, piano, and music history. Her instructors there included Abraham Jurafsky, Roberto García Morillo, Gilardo Gilardi, and Rafael González. During her career she has taught harmony and counterpoint at the Conservatorio Nacional Superior de Música and at the Santa Ana Institute in Buenos Aires. As a composer Benavente has produced a number of works for orchestra; she has also composed for chamber forces, for piano, for voice, and for chorus, and has been active in the realm of electronic music as well.

References

1932 births
Living people
Argentine classical composers
Women classical composers
20th-century classical composers
20th-century Argentine musicians
21st-century classical composers
21st-century Argentine musicians
Musicians from Buenos Aires
20th-century women composers
21st-century women composers
Argentine women composers